Vetri Mel Vetri is a 1989 Indian Tamil-language masala film directed by M. Thyagarajan in his debut. The film stars Prabhu as a spoilt and aimless man who eventually becomes a boxer, and Seetha as his wife. It was released on 1 December 1989 and became an average success.

Plot 

A spoilt, aimless man eventually becomes a boxer.

Cast 
 Prabhu as Rajkumar "Kumar"
 Seetha as Janaki
 S. S. Chandran
 Nassar as Duraipandi
 Anandaraj as Nagaraj
 Manorama as Janaki's school principal
 Disco Shanti
 Rocky as Vicky
 Dara Singh as Antony, Rajkumar's boxing trainer

Production 
Vetri Mel Vetri is the directorial debut of M. Thyagarajan.

Soundtrack 
The soundtrack was composed by Vijay Anand.

Release and reception 
Vetri Mel Vetri was released on 1 December 1989. B. S. S. of Kalki called it another routine masala fare, which was thankfully not nauseating. The film was an average success.

References

External links 
 

1980s masala films
1980s Tamil-language films
1989 directorial debut films
Indian boxing films